Gorod-Makit is a mountain in Amur Oblast, Russian Far East. At  it is the highest summit in the Yam-Alin. 

Gorod-Makit rises close to the Khabarovsk Krai border, about  SSW of the highest point of the contiguous Taikan Range.

The nearest airport is Ekimchan Airport.

See also
Highest points of Russian Federal subjects
List of mountains and hills of Russia

References

External links
Tourism, hiking
The highest peaks in Russia

Landforms of Amur Oblast
Highest points of Russian federal subjects

ru:Город-Макит